Towhid (also Romanized as Towḥīd) is a city in and the capital of Holeylan County in Ilam Province, Iran. At the 2006 census, its population was 604, in 132 families. The city is populated by Kurds.

References

Cities in Ilam Province
Kurdish settlements in Ilam Province